Apple Festival is a cultural festival that is celebrated annually in Guba, Azerbaijan on the days of harvesting apples.

The inaugural event was held in 2012. The festival features Azerbaijani fruit-cuisine  mainly the apples from Quba. Although the holiday is called "Apple Feast", it is dedicated not only to apples, but to other fruit crops.

On the days of the holiday, in the city of Quba - the horticultural center of Azerbaijan, exhibitions are held where gardeners demonstrate different varieties of apples and various products from them.

See also
 Goychay Pomegranate Festival

References

Festivals in Azerbaijan
Apple festivals
Quba District (Azerbaijan)
Recurring events established in 2012
Autumn events in Azerbaijan